Lilian Egloff (born 20 August 2002) is a German professional footballer who plays as a midfielder for Bundesliga club VfB Stuttgart.

Career
On 5 February 2020, Egloff made his debut for VfB Stuttgart against Bayer Leverkusen in the 2019–20 DFB-Pokal.

On 20 August 2020, Egloff extended his contract with VfB Stuttgart until June 2024.

References

External links
 
 

2002 births
Living people
German footballers
Association football midfielders
Germany youth international footballers
Bundesliga players
Regionalliga players
VfB Stuttgart players
VfB Stuttgart II players
Sportspeople from Heilbronn
Footballers from Baden-Württemberg